Antonopoulou is a Greek surname that is the female version of Antonopoulos. Notable people with this name include the following:

Kareen Antonopoulou, birthname of Kareen Antonn (born 1980), French artist
Maria N. Antonopoulou (born 1946), Greek sociology professor
Rania Antonopoulou (born 1960), Greek politician
Sophia N. Antonopoulou (born 1947), Greek economics professor

See also

Antonopoulos

Greek-language surnames
Patronymic surnames